Navniet S words Yadav (born 22 October 1971) is a 1996 batch IPS officer of Uttar Pradesh cadre, who is currently serving as the Additional Director General (ADG) of Uttar Pradesh Police.

Early life and education
Sekera was born in Shikohabad District Firozabad, Uttar Pradesh. His father's name is Manohar Singh Yadav. His wife, Dr. Pooja Sekera is a social activist, work for the empowerment of women against oppression. Sekera studied in All-boys Government school in Shikohabad in Firozabad district, UP. He graduated from IIT Roorkee, where he studied Computer Science and Engineering. He also did an MBA from the Indian School of Business in 2011.

Career
Sekera joined the Indian Police Service in 1996.  His initial posting was as Assistant Superintendent of Police (ASP) in Gorakhpur.  In 2001, he was promoted to the rank of Superintendent of Police. He was posted as (DIG) Deputy Inspector General of Police in 2012, as Inspector General of Police in 2014, and was subsequently appointed Inspector General (IG) of Mahila Power Line, Uttar Pradesh.

Sekera is focused on women and the girl child. He was the person who developed and organised the concept of ‘Women Power Line 1090,’. which was started by the UP government in 2012.

A web series Bhaukaal has been created based on Sekera, in which his character is played by TV actor Mohit Raina.

References

1971 births
Uttar Pradesh Police
Indian Police Service officers
IIT Roorkee alumni
People from Uttar Pradesh
Living people